A coulis is a form of thin sauce made from puréed and strained vegetables or fruits. A vegetable coulis is commonly used on meat and vegetable dishes, and it can also be used as a base for soups or other sauces.  Fruit coulis are most often used on desserts. Raspberry coulis, for example, is especially popular with poached apples or Key lime pie.

Older uses 
The term originally referred to the released juices of cooked meats, then usually to puréed meat-based soups, and today can sometimes refer to a puréed soup of shellfish.

See also
 Dessert sauce
 List of dessert sauces

References 

Sauces